S. L. Puram Sadanandan (15 April 1928 – 16 September 2005) was an Indian playwright and film scriptwriter from Kerala, India.

Career

In 1967, he got the first ever National Film Award for Best Screenplay for the film Agniputhri.

Death

He died on 16 September 2005. He was survived by his wife Omana Sadanandan and two sons, Jayasurya (who directed the films Speed Track Angel John and Jack & Daniel) and Jayasoma.

Awards
 1965: President's Silver Medal for Best Feature Film in Malayalam - Kavyamela
 1967: National Film Award for Best Screenplay - Agniputhri
 1995: Kerala Sangeetha Nataka Akademi Fellowship
 1991: Kerala Sangeetha Nataka Akademi Award

The Kerala Sangeetha Nataka Akademi has instituted an annual award, S. L. Puram Sadanandan Memorial Puraskaram, for recognising outstanding contributions to Malayalam theatre.

Filmography
Chemmeen
Vilakuranja Manushyan
Agniputhri 
Kallu Kondoru Pennu 
Kattukuthira
Yavanika
Kavyamela
Bhagyamudra
Kaadu
Nellu
Pathamudayam
Ivide Thudangunnu
Aadhya Paadam
Navavadhu
Karthika
Babumon

References

External links

S.L. Puram Sadanandan cremated
A communist who became doyen  of theatre

Narayana Guru
Kerala State Film Award winners
2005 deaths
Malayalam screenwriters
Malayalam-language dramatists and playwrights
1928 births
Indian male dramatists and playwrights
Indian male screenwriters
Film directors from Kerala
20th-century Indian dramatists and playwrights
People from Alappuzha district
Screenwriters from Kerala
20th-century Indian film directors
Malayalam film directors
Best Original Screenplay National Film Award winners
20th-century Indian screenwriters
Recipients of the Kerala Sangeetha Nataka Akademi Fellowship
Recipients of the Kerala Sangeetha Nataka Akademi Award